Shapur II besieged the fortress city of Bezabde in Zabdicene in 360, held by the Romans. Despite adamant resistance from three Roman legions and local archers, the Sasanians led by Shapur II successfully besieged Bezabde and defeated the Roman force.

A battering-ram reportedly brought down one of the towers, through which the besiegers entered the city.

Later that year, Constantius II tried to retake Bezabde, but was unsuccessful.

References

Sources
 
 
 

Battles of the Roman–Sasanian Wars
Sieges involving the Roman Empire
Sieges involving the Sasanian Empire
360s in the Roman Empire
4th century in Iran
Shapur II
Sieges of the Roman–Persian Wars